Linux Professional Institute (LPI) offers three different certification tracks. The core certification program, Linux Professional, contains three different levels addressing distinct aspects of Linux system administration. The organization also offers an introductory Essentials program for beginners in Linux and open source, as well as an Open Technology track for professionals working with additional technologies such as DevOps and BSD.

Availability and validity of the certifications 
The exams are delivered onsite at Linux and open source events, or through the network of the test centres such as Pearson VUE. 

The validity of a LPI certification is 5 years. The exception is the Linux Essentials certificate, which has lifetime validity.

Essentials Track 
The Essentials Program was created for candidates who are starting a career in open source or who wish to test their level of Linux knowledge.

Linux Essentials 
Linux Essentials is an entry level certificate that was introduced in 2012. The exam tests the candidate’s ability to use a basic command line editor and demonstrate an understanding of processes, programs and components of the Linux operating system.

Linux Professional Institute Web Development Essentials 
Linux Professional Institute Web Development Essentials focuses on the most important aspects of Web Development. Prerequisite is an understanding of the principles of software development, HTML, CSS, JavaScript, Node.js, and SQL.

Linux Professional Certification Track 
The Linux Professional Certification Program consists of the LPIC-1, LPIC-2, and LPIC-3 certifications.

LPIC-1 and LPIC-2 certifications are focusing on Linux System Administration. LPIC-3 level of certifications has several specialities: LPIC-3 Security, LPIC-3 Mixed Environments and LPIC-3 Virtualization and High Availability 

LPIC-1 and LPIC-2 certifications each require passing two exams, while each LPIC-3 level of certification requires passing a single exam.

Each exam has a series of topics which make up the exam objectives. Each objective has an associated weight that corresponds to the frequency of exam questions from that objective.

Linux Professional Institute LPIC-1 
LPIC-1 was first published on 11 January 2000 and was originally called Linux Server Professional (LPIC-1). The certification was revised in 2005, 2012, 2015 and 2018.

To be awarded the LPIC-1 certification the candidate must successfully pass two exams, 101 and 102. These can be taken in any order.

LPIC-1 certifies the ability to perform maintenance tasks with the command line, install and configure a computer running Linux and be able to configure basic networking.

Previously the 101 exam was split into two alternative exams, one including questions on the RPM Package Manager, and the other on Deb (file format). After the update in 2005 these have been merged into a single exam, and candidates are expected to know about both topics.

LPIC-1 Exam 101 Topics 

 System Architecture
 Linux Installation and Package Management
 GNU and Unix Commands
 Devices, Linux Filesystems, Filesystem Hierarchy Standard

LPIC-1 Exam 102 Topics 

 Shells and Shell Scripting
 User Interfaces and Desktops
 Administrative Tasks
 Essential System Services
 Networking Fundamentals
 Security

Linux Professional Institute LPIC-2 
LPIC-2 is the second certification in LPI’s multi-level professional certification program. This certification was first published on 29 November 2001 under the name Linux Network Professional (LPIC-2). The LPIC-2 certification was revised 2013 and February 2017.

LPIC-2 certifies the ability to administer small to medium–sized mixed networks, supervise assistants and advise the upper management.

Prerequisites: The candidate must have an active LPIC-1 certification to receive your LPIC-2 certification, but the LPIC-1 and LPIC-2 exams may be taken in any order.

LPIC-2 Exam 201 Topics 

 Capacity Planning
Linux kernel
 System startup
Filesystem and Devices
 Advanced Storage Device Administration
 Networking Configuration
 System Maintenance

LPIC-2 Exam 202 Topics 

 Domain Name Server
 Http Services
 File Sharing
 Network Client Management
 E-Mail Services
 System Security

Linux Professional Institute LPIC-3 
The LPIC-3 Certification program is designed for the enterprise-level Linux professional and represents the highest level of LPI's Linux Professional certification track. The LPIC-3 program consists of a single exam for each area of specialty; LPIC-3 300 Mixed Environment, LPIC-3 303 Security and LPIC-3 304 High Availability and Virtualization.

In order to receive the LPIC-3 certification, candidate must have an active LPIC-2 certification, but the LPIC-2 and LPIC-3 exams may be taken in any order.

Passing at least one of the 300 series specialty exams (300, 303 or 304) leads to the LPIC-3 certification.

LPIC-3 Mixed Environments 
The LPIC-3 Mixed Environments certification covers the administration of Linux systems enterprise-wide in a mixed environment.

LPIC-3 Exam 300 Topics 
Detailed Objectives:
 Samba Basics
 Samba and Active Directory Domains
 Samba Share Configuration
 Samba Client Configuration
 Linux Identity Management and File Sharing

LPIC-3 Security 

The LPIC-3 Security certification covers the administration of Linux systems enterprise-wide with an emphasis on security.

LPIC-3 Exam 303 Topics 
Topics:
 Cryptography
 Host Security
 Access Control
Network Security
Threats and Vulnerability Assessment

LPIC-3 Virtualization and High Availability 

The LPIC-3 Virtualization and High Availability certification covers the administration of Linux systems enterprise-wide with an emphasis on Virtualization and High Availability.

LPIC-3 Exam 304 Topics 
Topics:
 Virtualization
 High Availability Cluster Management
 High Availability Cluster Storage

LPIC-3 Virtualization and Containerization 
The LPIC-3 Virtualization and Containerization certification covers the administration of Linux systems enterprise-wide with an emphasis on virtualization and containerization.

LPIC-3 Exam 305 Topics 
Topics:
 Full Virtualization
 Container Virtualization
 VM Deployment and Provisioning

LPIC-3 High Availability and Storage Clusters 
The LPIC-3 High Availability and Storage Clusters certification covers the administration of Linux systems enterprise-wide with an emphasis on high availability systems and storage.

LPIC-3 Exam 306 Topics 
Topics:
 High Availability Cluster Management
 High Availability Cluster Storage
 High Availability Distributed Storage
 Single Node High Availability

Open Technology Track

Linux Professional Institute DevOps Tools Engineer 

Linux Professional Institute DevOps Tools Engineer was published October 16, 2017. The exam tests proficiency in open source tools such as configuration automation and container virtualization, which are used to implement the DevOps collaboration model.

Linux Professional Institute BSD Specialist 
Linux Professional Institute BSD Specialist certification focuses on the practical skills required to work successfully in a FreeBSD, NetBSD, or OpenBSD environment, and tests the knowledge and skills needed to administer BSD operating systems.

See also 

Linux Foundation Linux Certification
Red Hat Certification
Ubuntu Professional Certification
CompTIA Linux+
Project Management Institute
 (ISC)²
 Certified Information Systems Security Professional

References

External links 

 Linux Professional Institute
 Pearson VUE

Information technology qualifications